Nanduri Dam, is an earthfill and gravity dam on Tapti river near Ama Local Nallaher, Nashik district in the state of Maharashtra in India.

Specifications

Purpose
 Irrigation
 Water supply

See also
 Dams in Maharashtra
 List of reservoirs and dams in India

References

Dams in Nashik district
Dams on the Tapti River
Year of establishment missing